Immanuel Feyi-Waboso (born 20 December 2002) is a Welsh rugby union player, currently playing for Premiership Rugby side Exeter Chiefs. His preferred position is centre or wing.

Professional career
Feyi-Waboso began playing with Rumney RFC, and played for Cardiff Schools at U-11 and U-15 level.

Feyi-Waboso signed for the Cardiff Blues academy ahead of the 2020–21 season. He made his Cardiff Blues debut in Round 1 of the Pro14 Rainbow Cup against . Feyi-Waboso was forced to leave Cardiff after failing to secure a place in the medical programme at Cardiff University. He instead took a place at Aston University, forcing him to leave Wales.

On the 14th February 2022, Wasps announced the signing of the centre, from the 2022–2023 season onwards.

Following Wasp's expulsion from the league due to their administration, Feyi-Waboso was signed by Exeter Chiefs.

References

Living people
Welsh rugby union players
Cardiff Rugby players
Rugby union centres
Rugby union wings
2003 births

External links 
Exeter Chiefs profile